Andrés Méndez (born July 30, 1992) is a Colombian racing driver.

Racing career
Méndez began kart racing in 2008, encouraged by his father and grandfather, who were both professional racers.  He raced in the Easykart Colombia Junior Class, finishing in fourth place at the end of the season.  In 2009 he finished second in the KZ2 Class Open Colombia, and was recognized as ¨Rookie of the Year¨. He also raced internationally at the Industry Cup in Pomposa, Italy, and participated in an Easykart World Grand Final in Siena, Italy.

Méndez attended the Jim Russell Racing Driver School, and won the Six Hours of Bogotá in the FL2000 class.

In 2010, Méndez took part in the Florida Winter Tour in the Tag Senior class. He was selected to be part of the Jim Russell's Future Drive test, guided by Allan McNish. At the end of this year, he again won the Six Hours of Bogotá in a FL2000.

In 2011, Méndez finished fourth in the Florida Winter Tour  championship. He advanced to the third round of the Regional Rotax Max Challenge USA. He was selected to join the Ferrari Driver Academy, and did his first test in Fiorano, Italy, gaining experience in a Formula Abarth 1.6 turbo engine and Tatuus chassis. Near the end of the year he tested with Koiranen Brothers Motorsport Team in a Formula Renault 2.0 at Estoril. He finished the season winning the Six Hours of Bogotá for the third time.

In 2012 he signed with Team GDT to compete in the Star Mazda Championship. Méndez finished 14th in points with a best finish of seventh at Circuit Trois-Rivières.

In 2013 he drove in the Formula Renault 2.0 Northern European Cup with Mark Burdett Motorsport and finished 35th in points with a best finish of 13th at Silverstone

In 2014 Méndez signed with the German Formula Three Championship's Team Lotus Motopark.

For 2015, Méndez will race for Zele Racing in the Auto GP World Series.

Racing record

Star Mazda Championship

Complete Auto GP results
(key) (Races in bold indicate pole position) (Races in italics indicate fastest lap)

‡ Position when season was cancelled.

References

External links
 
 

1992 births
Living people
Colombian racing drivers
Indy Pro 2000 Championship drivers
Formula Renault 2.0 NEC drivers
German Formula Three Championship drivers
Auto GP drivers
Mark Burdett Motorsport drivers
Motopark Academy drivers